Ghost Fleet Overlord  is a fleet of test unmanned surface vehicles operated by the U.S. Navy. 

Ghost Fleet Overlord is being developed by the Department of Defense’s Strategic Capabilities Office. It is a partnership between the Defense Department's Strategic Capabilities Office and the Navy.

Vessels
The fourth ship will be  and is being built by Austal USA. In June 2021, there were two additional Ghost Fleet Overlord prototype USVs under construction and will be used to expand and accelerate the Navy’s experimentation and testing.

See also
Sea Hunter

References 

United States Navy
Ships of the United States Navy
Unmanned surface vehicles of USA